D219 is a state road in Dalmatia region of Croatia connecting D1 and D56 state roads to Bili Brig border crossing to Bosnia and Herzegovina.

The road, as well as all other state roads in Croatia, is managed and maintained by Hrvatske ceste, state owned company.

Traffic volume 

Traffic is regularly counted and reported by Hrvatske ceste, operator of the road. Substantial variations between annual (AADT) and summer (ASDT) traffic volumes are attributed to tourist traffic carried to the D1 state road.

Road junctions and populated areas

Sources

State roads in Croatia
Transport in Split-Dalmatia County